Thebaine (paramorphine), also known as codeine methyl enol ether, is an opiate alkaloid, its name coming from the Greek Θῆβαι, Thēbai (Thebes), an ancient city in Upper Egypt. A minor constituent of opium, thebaine is chemically similar to both morphine and codeine, but has stimulatory rather than depressant effects.  At high doses, it causes convulsions similar to strychnine poisoning. The synthetic enantiomer (+)-thebaine does show analgesic effects apparently mediated through opioid receptors, unlike the inactive natural enantiomer (−)-thebaine. While thebaine is not used therapeutically, it is the main alkaloid extracted from Papaver bracteatum (Iranian opium / Persian poppy) and can be converted industrially into a variety of compounds, including hydrocodone, hydromorphone, oxycodone, oxymorphone, nalbuphine, naloxone, naltrexone, buprenorphine, butorphanol and etorphine.

Thebaine is controlled under international law, is listed as a Class A drug under the Misuse of Drugs Act 1971 in the United Kingdom, is controlled as an analog of a Schedule II drug per the Analog Act in the United States, and is controlled with its derivatives and salts, as a Schedule I substance of the Controlled Drugs and Substances Act in Canada.  The 2013 US Drug Enforcement Administration (DEA) aggregate manufacturing quota for thebaine (ACSCN 9333) was unchanged from the previous year at 145 metric tons.

This alkaloid is biosynthetically related to salutaridine, oripavine, morphine and reticuline.

In 2012 there was an amounted 146,000 kilograms of thebaine produced. In 2013, Australia was the main producer of poppy straw rich in thebaine, followed by Spain and then France. By 2017, worldwide thebaine production dropped to 2,008 kg. Together, those three countries accounted for about 99 per cent of global production of such poppy straw. The Papaver bracteatum seed capsules are the primary source of thebaine, with the stem additionally yielding a significant amount.

The Canberra Times of 16 November 2022 reported that four batches of Hoyts brand poppy seeds were being recalled due to unusually high levels of thebaine, and that at least twelve people in New South Wales had required medical attention after ingesting them. As of 15 November 2022, Food Standards Australia New Zealand (FSANZ) is coordinating a national recall of a number of poppy seed products due to the potential presence of thebaine.

Synthesis

Research
Thebaine has been produced by GMO E. coli

See also
 Thebacon
 6,14-Endoethenotetrahydrooripavine - the central nucleus of the Bentley compound class of opioids which are derived from thebaine

References

4,5-Epoxymorphinans
Ethers
Natural opium alkaloids
Cyclohexadienes
Glycine receptor antagonists
Opiates
Convulsants